Theodore J. Stankiewicz (born November 25, 1993) is an American professional baseball pitcher for the Toros de Tijuana of the Mexican League. He was drafted by the Boston Red Sox in the 2nd round of the 2013 Major League Baseball draft and played in the 2020 Summer Olympics for the Mexico national baseball team.

Career
Stankiewicz was drafted by the New York Mets out of Fort Worth Christian School in the 2nd round, 75th overall, of the 2012 Major League Baseball draft, but did not sign.

Boston Red Sox
Stankiewicz was drafted by the Boston Red Sox out of Seminole State College in the second round, 45th overall, of the 2013 Major League Baseball draft. He made his professional debut with the Low-A Lowell Spinners.

In 2014, Stankiewicz played for the Single-A Greenville Drive, posting an 11–8 record and 3.72 ERA in 25 games. The following year, he played for the High-A Salem Red Sox, logging a 5–11 record and 4.01 ERA in 25 appearances. In 2016, Stankiewicz played for the Double-A Portland Sea Dogs, where he pitched to a 5–9 record and 4.71 ERA with 97 strikeouts in 135.2 innings pitched. He returned to Portland the following season, where he recorded a 5–6 record and 5.03 ERA in 25 appearances.

Stankiewicz split the 2018 season between Portland and the Triple-A Pawtucket Red Sox, accumulating an 8–14 record and 4.97 ERA with 115 strikeouts in 150.1 innings pitched. He returned to Pawtucket in 2019, where he pitched to a 6–7 record and 3.85 ERA in 24 appearances. On November 4, 2019, Stankiewicz elected free agency.

Uni-President Lions
On February 8, 2020, Stankiewicz signed with the Toros de Tijuana of the Mexican League. However, he did not play in a game with the team after the Mexican League season was cancelled because of the COVID-19 pandemic.

On July 30, 2020, Stankiewicz signed with the Uni-President Lions of the Chinese Professional Baseball League (CPBL). On August 28, Stankiewicz made his CPBL debut against the Rakuten Monkeys. In 10 games, 8 starts, in 2020 with the Lions, Stankiewicz logged a 6–0 record and 3.81 ERA with 47 strikeouts in 54.1 innings pitcher. In addition, Stankiewicz won the 2020 Taiwan Series with the Lions.

Stankiewicz re-signed with the team for the 2021 season. On July 1, 2021, Stankiewicz parted ways with the Lions so he could represent Mexico in the Olympics and seek opportunities elsewhere. In 50.1 innings of work in 2021, Stankiewicz pitched to a 1.07 ERA and 0.64 WHIP.

Toros de Tijuana
On July 2, 2021, Stankiewicz signed with the Toros de Tijuana of the Mexican League.

CTBC Brothers
On December 3, 2021, Stankiewicz signed with the CTBC Brothers of the Chinese Professional Baseball League for the 2022 season. On July 16, 2022, Stankiewicz requested and was granted his release due to family reasons. He finished the season with a 4.09 ERA and 1.38 WHIP over 88 innings.

Toros de Tijuana (second stint)
On November 3, 2022, Stankiewicz signed with the Toros de Tijuana of the Mexican League for the 2023 season.

International career
Stankiewicz was selected to the Mexico national baseball team at the 2020 Summer Olympics (contested in 2021).

Personal life
Stankiewicz is not related to former Major League Baseball player Andy Stankiewicz, who played 7 seasons in MLB.

Stankiewicz was born without a right pectoral muscle, a condition he was unaware of until he underwent his post-draft Red Sox physical.

In 2014, while driving a pickup on US 377, Stankiewicz drove left of center, entered a broadslide, and slammed into an oncoming vehicle. The other driver was pronounced dead at the scene.

References

External links

1993 births
Living people
American baseball players of Mexican descent
American expatriate baseball players in Taiwan
Baseball players from Texas
Lowell Spinners players
Greenville Drive players
Salem Red Sox players
Portland Sea Dogs players
Pawtucket Red Sox players
Mesa Solar Sox players
Algodoneros de Guasave players
Leones del Escogido players
American expatriate baseball players in the Dominican Republic
Uni-President Lions players
Baseball players at the 2020 Summer Olympics
Olympic baseball players of Mexico
CTBC Brothers players
Seminole State Trojans baseball players